Jeremy Allison is a computer programmer known for his contributions to the free software community, notably to Samba, a re-implementation of SMB/CIFS networking protocol, released under the GNU General Public License.

Other contributions include the early versions of the pwdump password cracking utility.

Career

Free software evangelism 
During his career, Jeremy Allison has consistently defended the free software approach:
 He pitched making Vantive code free software to its founder.
 He persuaded Michael Tiemann to use the GNU General Public License for Cygwin.
 He similarly convinced Tim Wilkinson to put the Kaffe virtual machine for Java under the GPL.
 He was involved in Silicon Graphics' decision to put XFS for Linux under the GPL.
This commitment to free software culminated with his decision to leave Novell in protest of a patent deal that was considered by many as a FUD attack on Linux and other free software, and by Allison as breaking section 7 of the GNU General Public License.

References

External links 
 Jeremy Allison's web page

1962 births
Living people
British computer programmers
Google employees